William Turnbull Lamont (25 December 1926 – 6 November 1996) was a Scottish footballer who played as left back for Kilmarnock, New Brighton, Tranmere Rovers and Cowdenbeath.

References

Kilmarnock F.C. players
New Brighton A.F.C. players
Tranmere Rovers F.C. players
Cowdenbeath F.C. players
1926 births
1996 deaths
Footballers from Glasgow
Association football fullbacks
Scottish Football League players
English Football League players
Scottish footballers